Bouchot is a surname. Notable people with the surname include:

François Bouchot (1800–1842), French painter and engraver
Henri Bouchot (1849-1906), French historian
Louis-Jules Bouchot (1817-1907), French architect
Rosita Bouchot (born 1948), Mexican actress and singer
Vincent Bouchot (born 1966), French composer and musicologist